Dabar is a village in Croatia, 21 km northeast of Otočac and a part of the Town of Otočac municipality.

History 
The ruins of a fortress called by the folk Sokolić rise on Vučjak hill; it has a square ground-plan and one cylindrical angle tower. First mentioned in 1499 as a fortress of the Frankopans, remained a borderline stronghold until the Turks were expelled from Lika. In 1773 already a "completely demolished town".

Gallery

References

External links 

Populated places in Lika-Senj County
Serb communities in Croatia